Cape St. George, anciently called Sepias, is a promontory of Magnesia. Sepias was also the name of a nearby town.

It is celebrated in Greek mythology as the spot where Peleus laid in wait for Thetis, and from whence he carried off the goddess, and in history as the scene of the great shipwreck of the fleet of Xerxes I just before the Battle of Thermopylae in 480 BCE; it is cited by many ancient authors. Some other ships of Xerxes' fleet crashed near Meliboea.

References

Landforms of Magnesia (regional unit)
St George
Ancient Magnesia
Greco-Persian Wars